Whilldin–Miller House is located in West Cape May, Cape May County, New Jersey, United States. The front portion of the house was built in 1860 and added to the National Register of Historic Places on February 12, 2003.  The original timber frame 2-story house remaining in the rear was built by Joseph Whilldin about 1715.

See also
National Register of Historic Places listings in Cape May County, New Jersey

References

Houses completed in 1860
Georgian architecture in New Jersey
Houses on the National Register of Historic Places in New Jersey
Houses in Cape May County, New Jersey
Italianate architecture in New Jersey
National Register of Historic Places in Cape May County, New Jersey
New Jersey Register of Historic Places
West Cape May, New Jersey